The following is a list of episodes of Time Team, a British television programme about archaeology, that has aired on Channel 4 since 16 January 1994. The twentieth series started on 11 November 2012, with its final episode broadcast on 10 March 2013.  Nine further specials (essentially an irregularly scheduled twenty-first series) aired through 2013 and 2014.

The episode numbers follow the order of first transmission.

Episodes

Pilot

Series 1 (1994)

Series 2 (1995)

Series 3 (1996)

Series 4 (1997)

Series 5 (1998)

Series 6 (1999)

Series 7 (2000)

Series 8 (2001)

Series 9 (2002)

Series 10 (2003)

Series 11 (2004)

Series 12 (2005)

Series 13 (2006)

Series 14 (2007)

Series 15 (2008)

Series 16 (2009)

Series 17 (2010)

Series 18 (2011)

Series 19 (2012)

Series 20 (2012–13)

Series 21 (2022)

Specials

Others
These are more documentaries and not really a regular type of episode.

See also
 Time Team Live
 Time Team History Hunters
 Time Team Digs
 Time Team Extra
 Time Team America

Notes

References

External links
Time Team at Channel4.com
Time Team Digital website

Time Team episodes
Time Team